Brimpsfield Priory was a Benedictine monastic foundation in Brimpsfield, Gloucestershire, England, a cell or grange of the Abbey of Saint-Wandrille in Normandy. It was almost certainly founded between 1086 and 1100 by a member of the Giffard family, as lords of Brimpsfield, and was endowed with the demesne and advowson of the church.

As an alien priory it was confiscated by Henry V under the Act of 1414. Henry VI gave it to Eton College in 1441. Edward IV confirmed the gift in 1467 but in 1474 gave it to the dean and chapter of Windsor.

References

Monasteries in Gloucestershire
Benedictine monasteries in England
Alien priories in England